Harihareshwara Temple is a Hindu temple situated in Harihar, Karnataka state, India. The temple was built in c. 1223–1224 CE by Polalva, a commander and minister of the Hoysala Empire King Vira Narasimha II. In 1268 CE, Soma, a commander of King Narasimha III of the same dynasty made some additions. The temple houses the deity Harihara, a fusion of the Hindu gods Vishnu and Shiva. The image of the deity is a fusion of the right vertical half of Shiva and left vertical half of Vishnu. The image holds in its right hand, the attributes of Shiva and in the left hand, those of Vishnu.

Legend
According to a Hindu legend, a demon named Guha (or Guhasura) once lived in these parts and a considerable surrounding region, from Uchchangi Durga in the east, Govinahalu in the south, Mudanur in the west and Airani in the north was under his control. Guha successfully appeased Hindu god Brahma with his penance and obtained a boon, by virtue of which, it would be impossible for either Hari (Vishnu) or Hara (Shiva) to singly kill him. Guha then became a regular tormentor of gods and humans alike. In order to overcome Brahma's boon and eliminate Guha, Vishnu and Shiva together took the form of Harihara (a fusion), came down to earth and killed the demon. The descent of the incarnation on earth is said to be at nearby Kudalur, at the confluence of the rivers Tungabhadra and Haridra.

Temple plan

The temple is constructed in a staggered square mantapa (hall) plan, typical of Hoysala constructions. Therefore, the outer wall of the mantapa shows many projections and recesses. The wall of the mantapa is a parapet wall resting on which are half pillars that support the outer ends of the roof (cornice). The ceiling of the open mantapa is adorned with artistic decoration such as lotuses. The ceiling is supported by lathe turned full pillars. The material used for the temple is soapstone (also called potstone). The original tower over the shrine (Vimana) is missing and has been replaced in modern times with one of brick and mortar. Preserved within the temple premises are several old-Kannada inscriptions and hero stones.

Gallery

Notes

References

 

 

Religious buildings and structures completed in 1224
13th-century Hindu temples
Hindu temples in Davanagere district